Patricia Walsh (born 1952) is an Argentine political activist, daughter of Rodolfo Walsh.

She was during 2001-05 a deputy in the Argentine national assembly for Buenos Aires city, and in 2003 she was a candidate in the Argentine presidential election.  She was in Izquierda Unida, and has been involved in the campaign to find out what happened to her father.

References

External links 
article

Argentine people of Irish descent
21st-century Argentine women politicians
21st-century Argentine politicians
Living people
1952 births
Politicians from Buenos Aires
Place of birth missing (living people)